BLS AG is a Swiss railway company created by the 2006 merger of BLS Lötschbergbahn and Regionalverkehr Mittelland AG. It is 55.8% owned by the canton of Berne, and 21.7% by the Swiss Confederation. It has two main business fields: passenger traffic and infrastructure.

BLS has a subsidiary—BLS Cargo—which is responsible for all freight operations. BLS Cargo works in cooperation with the freight subsidiary of Deutsche Bahn, Railion. However, the staff, apart from management and sales, is employed by BLS AG. Part of the BLS locomotive fleet is owned by BLS Cargo.

Another subsidiary, BLS Fernverkehr AG, is responsible for long-distance passenger transport. BLS Fernverkehr AG is wholly owned by BLS AG.

Infrastructure
In 2007 the new, Lötschberg Base Tunnel opened, which is part of the 449 km of infrastructure owned and operated by BLS AG.  The Lötschberg base tunnel was built by a wholly owned subsidiary, BLS AlpTransit AG. By mid-2007 this company handed over the base tunnel to BLS AG. In 2009 this company was renamed BLS Netz AG and the entire BLS infrastructure passed over to this company which is mainly owned by the Swiss Confederation, which has paid for most of the recent investments.

BLS AG owns or operates on the following railway lines:
 Bern–Neuchâtel railway line
 Grenchenberg railway line
 Gürbetal railway line
 Hauenstein railway line
 Lake Thun railway line
 Lötschberg railway line
 Spiez–Erlenbach–Zweisimmen railway line

Rolling stock
Also see Bern–Lötschberg–Simplon railway#Locomotives and multiple units

 3 x BLS Re 420
 33 x BLS Re 425
 18 x BLS Re 465
 28 x BLS RABe 515
 36 x BLS RABe 525
 13 x BLS RABe 526
 30 x BLS RABe 528 (+ 28 under delivery)
 25 x BLS RABe 535
 21 x BLS RADe 565
 13 x BLS RADe 566

BLS Cargo has the following rolling stock.
 4 x BLS Re 425
 2 x BLS Re 456
 10 x BLS Re 465
 15 x BLS Re 475
 20 x BLS Re 485
 10 x BLS Re 486
 1 x BLS Am 845

In 2010, 28 Stadler KISS EMUs were ordered; the first was delivered in March 2012. , BLS was planning to spend around 1·2bn SFr on new rolling stock by 2025, building a more standardised fleet with fewer different types of train. In 2017, 58 Stadler FLIRT EMUs were ordered, expected to enter service between 2021 and 2026.

Passenger train services
Since the merger, BLS has been the exclusive operator of the standard gauge part of the S-Bahn Bern. This includes open access services over Swiss Federal Railways (SBB) and STB Sensetalbahn tracks. Since December 2007 BLS offers a new RegioExpress service over the old Lötschberg route while most SBB and Cisalpino, InterCity, and EuroCity trains use the new Lötschberg tunnel. Here is a full list of regular BLS train services:

S-Bahn Bern
S1 Fribourg-Bern-Münsingen-Thun
S2 Laupen-Bern-Konolfingen-Langnau
S3 Biel/Bienne-Lyss-Bern-Belp
S31 (Biel/Bienne-)Münchenbuchsee-Bern-Belp-Thun
S4  Thun-Belp-Bern-Burgdorf-Langnau
S44 Thun-Belp-Bern-Burgdorf-Solothurn/Sumiswald-Grünen
S5 Bern-Kerzers-Neuenburg/Murten(-Payerne)
S51 Bern-Stöckacker-Bern Brünnen Westside
S52 Bern-Bern Brünnen Westside-Kerzers
S6 Bern-Köniz-Schwarzenburg

S-Bahn Luzern
S6 Langnau-Wolhusen-Malters-Luzern
S7 Langenthal-Huttwil-Willisau-Wolhusen-Luzern (coupled with the RE Bern-Luzern between Wolhusen and Luzern)

RegioExpress (RE)

RE Bern-Langnau-Luzern
RE Bern-Neuchâtel-La Chaux-de-Fonds
RE Bern-Münsingen-Spiez-Brig/Zweisimmen

Regional trains (R)

R Interlaken Ost-Spiez-Wiessenbach-Zweisimmen
R Spiez-Frutigen
R Thun-Konolfingen-Hasle Rüegsau
R Thun-Konolfingen-Burgdorf-Solothurn
R Kerzers-Lyss
R Lyss-Büren a. Aare

BLS Busland
BLS Busland operates a fleet of 36 buses over a network that complements the passenger train services. The bus fleet comprises:
 Mercedes-Benz Citaro
 Volvo B7L

BLS Navigation

BLS owns and operates steamers on Lake Brienz and Lake Thun under the BLS Navigation brand. These steamers utilise the Interlaken and Thun ship canals.
 Blümlisalp, paddle steamer built in 1906

References

External links 

 BLS AG